Tonco is a comune (municipality) in the Province of Asti in the Italian region Piedmont, located about  east of Turin and about  north of Asti.

Tonco borders the following municipalities: Alfiano Natta, Calliano, Castell'Alfero, Corsione, Frinco, Montiglio Monferrato, Villa San Secondo, and Villadeati.

Demographic evolution

References

External links
 www.comune.tonco.at.it/

Cities and towns in Piedmont